1955 was the 56th season of County Championship cricket in England and there was a continuation of Surrey's complete dominance as they won a fourth successive championship title and a second consecutive Minor Counties title. England defeated South Africa 3–2.

Honours
County Championship – Surrey
Minor Counties Championship – Surrey II
Wisden – Colin Cowdrey, Doug Insole, Jackie McGlew, Hugh Tayfield, Frank Tyson

Test series

England won a thrilling Test series against South Africa by 3–2. England won the first two matches and then South Africa equalised the series with wins in the 3rd and 4th matches. The fifth Test was therefore the decider and England, thanks to the spin bowling of Tony Lock and Jim Laker, won by 92 runs.

County Championship

Leading batsmen
Jackie McGlew topped the averages with 1871 runs @ 58.46.

Leading bowlers
Bob Appleyard topped the averages with 85 wickets @ 13.01.

References

Annual reviews
 Playfair Cricket Annual 1956
 Wisden Cricketers' Almanack 1956

External links
 CricketArchive – season summary

1955 in English cricket
English cricket seasons in the 20th century